UvrD may refer to:
 UvrABC endonuclease, an enzyme
 DNA helicase, an enzyme class